Globoko ob Dravinji is a village on the left bank of the Dravinja River in the Municipality of Poljčane in northeastern Slovenia. The area is part of the traditional region of Styria. It is now included with the rest of the municipality in the Drava Statistical Region.

Name
The settlement was formerly simply named Globoko, and it was renamed Globoko ob Dravinji in 1998.

References

External links
Globoko ob Dravinji on Geopedia

Populated places in the Municipality of Poljčane